Zanola impedita is a moth in the family Apatelodidae. It was described by Paul Dognin in 1916. It is found in Colombia.

References

Apatelodidae
Moths described in 1916